The Leese Baronetcy, of Sendholme in Send in the County of Surrey, is a dormant title in the Baronetage of the United Kingdom. It was created on 15 July 1908 for Joseph Leese, Liberal Member of Parliament for Accrington from 1892 to 1910. The third Baronet was a Lieutenant-General in the Coldstream Guards  and served as Commander-in-Chief of the Allied Land Forces in South-East Asia from 1944 to 1945 and as General Officer Commanding-in-Chief of the Eastern Command from 1945 to 1946. The baronetcy became dormant on the death of the fourth Baronet in 1979. For more information, follow this link.

Leese baronets, of Send Holme (1908)
Sir Joseph Francis Leese, 1st Baronet (1845–1914)
Sir William Hargreaves Leese, 2nd Baronet (1868–1937)
Sir Oliver William Hargreaves Leese, 3rd Baronet (1894–1978)
Sir Alexander William Leese, 4th Baronet (1909–1979)

References
Kidd, Charles, Williamson, David (editors). Debrett's Peerage and Baronetage (1990 edition). New York: St Martin's Press, 1990.

Leese